Melhus Station is a railway station in the village of Melhus in the municipality of Melhus in Trøndelag county, Norway. It is served by local trains to Røros Station. The station was opened 1993 and is somewhat south of the old station in Melhus.

References

Railway stations in Melhus
Railway stations on the Dovre Line
Railway stations opened in 1993
1993 establishments in Norway